The 1962 Howard Bulldogs football team was an American football team that represented Howard College (now known as the Samford University) as an independent during the 1962 NCAA College Division football season. In their fourth year under head coach Bobby Bowden, the team compiled an 7–2 record. In January 1963, Bowden resigned as head coach at Howard to accept an assistant coaching position at Florida State.

Schedule

References

Howard
Samford Bulldogs football seasons
Howard Bulldogs football